KLBG (95.5 FM) is a commercial radio station licensed to serve Lindsborg, Kansas, United States. The station is owned by Rocking M Media, LLC, while operated by Meridian Media, LLC under a local marketing agreement.

History
KLBG started as KQNS-FM in September 1988, then located on 95.9 FM with an ERP of 1.3 kW. At the time, the station carried an adult contemporary format. In 1994, B-B Broadcasting bought the station from Smoky Hill Broadcasting, and the following year, the station moved to 95.5 FM and upgraded their power to 15.5 kW. By this time, the station flipped to a mainstream rock format, branded as "Star 95." In 1999, the station flipped back to adult contemporary, keeping the "Star 95" moniker. In 2004, the station began running the "Hits & Favorites" satellite feed from Citadel Media (now Cumulus Media Networks) and changed monikers to "Lite Rock 95.5". A year later, the station switched satellite feeds to Westwood One's AC feed, again keeping the "Lite Rock 95.5" moniker. In 2006, the station rebranded as "OZ 95", again keeping the AC format. In 2007, the station flipped to adult hits, branded as "Bob FM". The station was assigned the KVOB call sign by the Federal Communications Commission on December 1, 2007. A year later, the station switched to Sparknet Communications' national feed of "Jack FM", again retaining the adult hits format.

On December 25, 2012, at Midnight, the station flipped to active rock, branded as "95.5 The Rock." The station began carrying the "Rock 2.0" feed from Dial Global. Due to a technical error, the Jack FM feed and the new format were both heard simultaneously until it was corrected the following day.

The station aired several weekend specialty programs such as "The House of Hair with Dee Snider", and "Racing Rocks with Riki Rachtman". KVOB also broadcast several local sports teams including Smoky Valley high school, Bethany College, and the Salina Sirens roller derby. It also aired the NASCAR Sprint Cup Series via the Motor Racing Network and Performance Racing Network.

KVOB would fall silent in March 2022.

As part of owner Rocking M Media's bankruptcy reorganization, in which 12 stations in Kansas would be auctioned off to new owners, it was announced on October 31, 2022 that Hutchinson-based Ad Astra Per Aspera Broadcasting was the winning bidder for KVOB and Larned-based KSOB and KNNS for $40,000. While the bankruptcy court had approved the purchase, the sale was officially filed to the FCC on January 9, 2023. Ahead of the closure of the sale, Ad Astra Per Aspera had applied a new KLBG call sign for the station, which took effect on March 1.

On January 13, 2023, KVOB would return to the air, this time simulcasting sister station KZUH's Top 40/CHR format.

References

External links

LBG
McPherson County, Kansas
Radio stations established in 1988
Mainstream rock radio stations in the United States
1988 establishments in Kansas